Pecteneremus albella is a moth in the family Autostichidae. It was described by Hans Georg Amsel in 1959 and is found in Iran.

References

Moths described in 1959
Pecteneremus